1071 Brita, provisional designation , is a dark asteroid from the background population of the intermediate asteroid belt, approximately 50 kilometers in diameter. It was discovered on 3 March 1924, by Soviet astronomer Vladimir Albitsky at the Simeiz Observatory on the Crimean peninsula. The asteroid was named after the island of Great Britain.

Orbit and classification 

Brita is a non-family asteroid from the main belt's background population. It orbits the Sun on the outer rim of the central asteroid belt at a distance of 2.5–3.1 AU once every 4 years and 8 months (1,712 days; semi-major axis of 2.80 AU). Its orbit has an eccentricity of 0.11 and an inclination of 5° with respect to the ecliptic.

The body's observation arc begins at Lowell Observatory in October 1931, more than 7 years after its official discovery observation Simeiz.

Physical characteristics 

In the SMASS classification, Brita is an Xk-subtype that transitions from the X-type to the rare K-type asteroids.

Rotation period 

In 2001, a first, fragmentary lightcurve of Brita was published by a group of Brazilian and Argentine astronomers. Lightcurve analysis gave a rotation period of 5.8 hours with a brightness variation of 0.38 magnitude. Between 2008 and 2016, photometric observations gave three well-defined periods of 5.805, 5.8158 and 5.8169 hours and an amplitude of 0.19, 0.23 and 0.20 magnitude, respectively.

Diameter and albedo 

According to the surveys carried out by the Infrared Astronomical Satellite IRAS, the Japanese Akari satellite and the NEOWISE mission of NASA's Wide-field Infrared Survey Explorer, Brita measures between 39.45 and 64.23 kilometers in diameter and its surface has an albedo between 0.03 and 0.07.

The Collaborative Asteroid Lightcurve Link derives an albedo of 0.0486 and a diameter of 50.14 kilometers based on an absolute magnitude of 10.4.

Naming 

This minor planet was named after the island of Great Britain, where the discovering observatory's 1-meter telescope was built. The author of the Dictionary of Minor Planet Names, Lutz Schmadel, learned about the naming circumstances from Crimean astronomers N. Solovaya and N. S. Chernykh (see 2325 Chernykh).

References

External links 
 (1071) Brita, summary at AstDyS-2
 Asteroid Lightcurve Database (LCDB), query form (info )
 Dictionary of Minor Planet Names, Google books
 Asteroids and comets rotation curves, CdR – Observatoire de Genève, Raoul Behrend
 Discovery Circumstances: Numbered Minor Planets (1)-(5000) – Minor Planet Center
 
 

001071
Discoveries by Vladimir Albitsky
Named minor planets
001071
19240303